Pegangsaan Dua Station is a light rail station of the Jakarta LRT Line A. The station is located at Pegangsaan Dua, Kelapa Gading, North Jakarta.

The station is one of the six stations of the first phase of Jakarta LRT Line A which opened on 1 December 2019.

Services
  Line 1, to

References

North Jakarta
Jakarta LRT stations
Railway stations opened in 2019